Cripple Creek is a 1952 American Western film directed by Ray Nazarro and starring George Montgomery.

Plot
It's 1893 and gold is being smuggled out of the country. Instead of stealing gold bars, the outlaws are stealing high-grade ore, having it smelted, and then having it plated to look like lead. The Government sends agents Bret (George Montgomery) and Larry (Jerome Courtland) who arrive in Cripple Creek posing as Texas gunfighters. While their partner, Strap (Richard Egan) works on the inside as an informant, Bret finds the smelting operation and Larry learns of the payoff. The crooked town Marshal is suspicious of the two men. The reply to his inquiry to Texas exposes them, putting their lives in danger.

Cast
 George Montgomery as Bret Ivers
 Jerome Courtland as Larry Galland 
 Richard Egan as Strap Galland alias Gillis 
 Karin Booth as Julie Hanson 
 William Bishop as Silver Kirby 
 Don Porter as Denver Jones 
 John Dehner as Emil Cabeau 
 Roy Roberts as Marshal John Tetheroe 
 George Cleveland as 'Hardrock' Hanson

Production
Filming started 27 February 1951.

See also
 List of American films of 1952

References

External links
 
 
 
 

1952 films
1952 Western (genre) films
American Western (genre) films
Films adapted into comics
Films directed by Ray Nazarro
Films produced by Edward Small
Films set in 1893
Columbia Pictures films
1950s English-language films
1950s American films
Films with screenplays by Richard Schayer